Delhi Sultanate was an Islamic empire based in Delhi that stretched over large parts of South Asia for 320 years (1206-1526). Following the invasion of the subcontinent by the Ghurid dynasty, Qutbuddin Aibak Was the first sultan of Delhi Sultanate, five dynasties ruled over the Delhi Sultanate sequentially:the Mamluk dynasty (1206-1290), the Khalji dynasty (1290-1320), the Tughlaq dynasty (1320 1414), the Sayyid dynasty (1414-1451), and the Lodi dynasty (1451-1526) later replaced by Mughal Empire. It covered large swaths of territory in modern-day India, Pakistan, and Bangladesh as well as some parts of southern Nepal. Delhi Sultanate Start their Expansion During Iltutmish and Later during Alauddin Khalji reign, who captured Rajputana, South India

Battle during Mamlulk dynasty

Battle's During Khalji dynasty

Battle's Involving Tughlaq dynasty

Delhi Sultanate
Delhi Sultanate
Medieval Islamic world-related lists